Guje Lagerwall, born Gun-Marie Sjöström, (13 January 1918 – 8 January 2019) was a Swedish actress.

Life 
Gun-Marie Sjöström was the daughter of film director and actor Victor Sjöström and actress Edith Erastoff-Sjöström. Lagerwall herself started an acting career and played supporting roles in a number of films. She sometimes worked under the name Guje Kanter. She was interviewed about her father in Kevin Brownlow's 1995 documentary Cinema Europe: The Other Hollywood.

She was married to actor Sture Lagerwall from 1940 until their divorce in 1956. Guje Lagerwall died aged 100, five days before her 101st birthday.

Filmography
Doktor Glas (1942)
 Maria of Kvarngarden (1945)
Divorced (1951)
 Blondie, Beef and the Banana (1952)
Han glömde henne aldrig (1952)
International Criminal Police Commission
Den underbara lögnen (1955)
Farligt löfte (1955)

References

External links

Swedish actresses
1918 births
2019 deaths
Swedish centenarians
Women centenarians